Mountainland Technical College (MTECH) is a public community college in Lehi, Utah with additional campuses in Orem and Spanish Fork. MTECH also offers courses in cooperation with Utah Valley University at UVU's Wasatch campus in Heber.

Mountainland Applied Technology College
In 2017, the Utah State Legislature replaced the Utah College of Applied Technology with the Utah System of Technical Colleges (USTC). Each of the former regional applied technology colleges were renamed as "technical colleges." Renaming Mountainland Applied Technology College (MATC) to Mountainland Technical College (MTECH).

Mountainland Technical College 
In May of 2019, MTEC broke ground on a second building at their Lehi campus. This building would house their automated manufacturing, machining, information technology, and other programs. It would be 89,000 square feet, two stories high, and was projected to open in the fall of 2020.

References

External links
 Official website

Educational institutions established in 1989
Universities and colleges in Utah County, Utah
Utah College of Applied Technology Colleges
1989 establishments in Utah